Fuchsia hatschbachii, called Hatschbach's fuchsia, is a species of flowering plant in the genus Fuchsia, endemic to the state of Paraná in Brazil. It has gained the Royal Horticultural Society's Award of Garden Merit.

References

hatschbachii
Flora of Paraná (state)
Plants described in 1989